Kera Birkeland is an American politician, educator, and coach from Utah. She currently serves as the representative for Utah House District 53. She is on the Executive Offices and Criminal Justice Appropriations Subcommittee, House Education Committee, and House Judiciary Committee. Birkeland replaced Logan Wilde in April 2020, and was elected to a full term in 2020, with 64 percent of the vote.

Prior to election, she competed in the 2012 Mrs. Utah pageant and served as a delegate at the Republican National Convention in the 2016 Republican Party presidential primaries, representing Ted Cruz. She expressed distaste toward Donald Trump at the time.

In January 2021, Birkeland introduced a resolution to honor Utah Jazz player Donovan Mitchell over retired player Shaquille O'Neal, as well as to make 'Spida' (Mitchell's nickname) the state arachnid of Utah. The resolution passed. During the 2021 legislative session, Birkeland lead efforts and introduced a bill to ban female transgender athletes from highschool sports in Utah. This was vetoed by Republican Governor Spencer Cox but passed with a supermajority in the legislature in a subsequent vote after proponents flipped ten votes in the state house and five in the senate. The law  currently faces ongoing litigation led by the ACLU of Utah.   In August, a state judge issued an injunction stopping enforcement of the ban, but left the rest of the bill in effect, meaning that transgender girls can seek permission from the commission to play on girls high school sports teams.

References

Year of birth missing (living people)
1980s births
Living people
Republican Party members of the Utah House of Representatives
Brigham Young University alumni
American beauty pageant contestants